Alphonso "Al" Campbell (born 31 August 1954) is a Jamaican reggae singer active since the late 1960s.

Biography
Born in Kingston, Jamaica, Campbell's singing career began in church, where his father was a preacher, and Al would sing to raise funds. He went to school with Lloyd James (aka Prince Jammy) and formed a vocal group with friends as a teenager, called The Thrillers, who recorded in the late 1960s for Studio One. After briefly joining up with Freddie McGregor and Ernest Wilson, he went on to work with Prince Lincoln Thompson's Royal Rasses, and the Mighty Cloud band.  Campbell then embarked on a solo career (also contributing vocals to two Heptones albums), and was a popular roots reggae singer during the 1970s, recording for producers such as Phil Pratt, Bunny Lee, and Joe Gibbs, and recorded at Lee Perry's Black Ark studio. 

His "Gee Baby" was a big hit in 1975 in both Jamaica and the United Kingdom. He adapted successfully to the early dancehall and lovers rock styles in the late 1970s and 1980s, working with producers such as Linval Thompson. Campbell's recording of "Late Night Blues" (1980) became a staple of blues parties. Campbell performed with the Stur-Gav sound system in the early 1980s. More recently he has recorded for King Jammy, Philip "Fatis" Burrell, and Mafia & Fluxy.

In 1997, he joined Cornell Campbell and Jimmy Riley in a new version of The Uniques, the group releasing a self-titled album in 1999.

Campbell has not performed in Jamaica since a stageshow held by Jack Ruby shortly before the latter's death. He continues to tour Europe and North America

Albums
Gee Baby (1977) Phil Pratt/Sunshot
Ain't That Loving You (1978) Jamaica Sound (reissued 1994 as Sly & Robbie Presents The Soulful Al Campbell)
Loving Moods of Al Campbell (1978) Ital
Mr. Music Man (1978) Manic
No More Running (1978) Terminal
Showcase (1978) DEB
Rainy Days (1978) Hawkeye
Diamonds (1979) Burning Sounds
More Al Campbell Showcase (197?) Ethnic
Mr. Lovers Rock (1980) Sonic Sounds
Late Night Blues (1980) JB
The Other Side of Love (1981) Greensleeves
Dance Hall Stylee (1982) Narrows Enterprise
Bad Boy (1984) CSA
Freedom Street (1984) Londisc
Forward Natty (1985) Move
Shaggy Raggy (1985) Sampalu
Reggae '85 (1985) Blue Mountain
Fence Too Tall (1987) Live & Love
Ain't Too Proud To Beg - LP (1987) Live & Love
Bounce Back (1990) Reggae Road
The Soulful Al Campbell (1994) Rhino
Road Block (1997) Exterminator
Revival Selection (1998) Kickin'
22 Karat Solid Gold (1998) Reggae Road
22 Karat Gold Volume 2 (1998) Reggae Road
Rock On (1998) Charm
Hit Me With Music (1998) Hot Shot
Roots & Culture (1999) Jet Star
Today, Tomorrow, Forever (2000) Reggae Road
Deeper Roots (2001) Reggae Road
Always In My Heart (2001) Artists Only
Higher Heights (2002) Reggae Road
Love From a Distance (2003) Cousins
Tribute to Clement Coxsone Dodd (2004) Reggae Road
24/7 (2006) Reggae Road
Rasta Time - Lagoon
Talk About Love - Sonic Sounds
It's Magic - free world music

References

External links
 Al Campbell at Roots Archives
 Al Campbell discography at ReggaeID

AllMusic
Jamaican reggae musicians
Musicians from Kingston, Jamaica
1954 births
Living people
The Uniques (Jamaican group) members
Greensleeves Records artists
Rhino Records artists